Archips mortuanus, the dusky-back leaf roller, is a species of moth of the family Tortricidae. It is found in eastern North America, where it has been recorded from Maine, Michigan and New York.

The length of the forewings is 7–9 mm. The forewing pattern of the males consists of at least one (and usually two) semi-rectangular pale tan patches on the costa. Adults are on wing from June to July in one generation per year.

The larvae feed on the leaves of Prunus virginiana, Populus balsamifera, Populus tremuloides, Cicuta, Alnus, Malus, Spiraea, Salix (including Salix bebbiana) and Crataegus species. The larvae have a green body and a yellowish brown head. They reach a length of 14–22 m when full-grown. The species overwinters as an egg.

References

Moths described in 1907
Archips
Moths of North America